Placidia was a daughter of Valentinian III, Roman emperor of the West from 425 to 455, and from 454/455 the wife of Olybrius, who became western Roman emperor in 472. She was one of the last imperial spouses in the Roman west, during the Fall of the Western Roman Empire during Late Antiquity.

Biography
In 455 she was taken prisoner in the Sack of Rome by Gaiseric, King of the Vandals, together with her mother Licinia Eudoxia and her elder sister Eudocia, spending several years in the Vandal Kingdom while Gaiseric promoted Olybrius's claim to the empire. She was a nobilissima femina, known to have been living in Constantinople in 478 and 484.

Family
Placidia was the second daughter of Valentinian III and Licinia Eudoxia, younger sister of Eudocia, who became the wife of Huneric, son of Gaiseric, king of the Vandals. Both were named for their grandmothers: Eudocia for the maternal, Aelia Eudocia, and Placidia for the paternal, Galla Placidia. Placidia is estimated to have been born between 439 and 443.

Marriage
In 454 or 455, Placidia married Anicius Olybrius, a member of the Anicii family, a prominent family with known members active in both Italia and Gaul. The exact relation of Olybrius to other members of the family is not known as his parents are not named in primary sources. Several theories exist as to their identity.

Originally Emperor Valentinian intended to marry Placidia to a young man named Majorian (the future emperor), whom Oost describes as having "distinguished himself in a subaltern capacity fighting in Gaul against the Franks under Aëtius' own command." Doing so, according to Roman customs, would instantly link Majorian to the Imperial family and put him in line to succeed Valentinian. Once Flavius Aetius learned of this plan, he rusticated Majorian to his estates at some date before 451, and he was recalled to Rome only after Aetius' death. Aetius also attempted to consolidate his position "by compelling the Emperor to swear to friendship with him and to agree to betroth Placidia to his own younger son Gaudentius."

Mommaerts and Kelley have proposed a theory that Petronius Maximus, the successor of Valentinian III on the Western Roman throne in 455, was behind the marriage of Placidia to Olybrius. They argue that Olybrius was likely a son of Petronius Maximus himself, reasoning that Petronius, once on the throne, would be unlikely to promote distant relatives as potential successors. According to Hydatius, Petronius arranged the marriage of his eldest stepdaughter Eudocia to Palladius, his eldest son and Caesar. They suggest that he followed suit in arranging the marriage of Placidia to one of his own younger sons, thus making the marriage of Placidia and Olybrius the third marriage between a member of the Theodosian dynasty and a member of the extended Anicii family within the same year.

Vandal captivity
According to the chronicler Malchus, "Around this time, the empress Eudoxia, the widow of the emperor Valentinian and the daughter of the emperor Theodosius and Eudocia, remained unhappily at Rome and, enraged at the tyrant Maximus because of the murder of her spouse, she summoned the Vandal Gaiseric, king of Africa, against Maximus, who was ruling Rome. He came suddenly to Rome with his forces and captured the city, and having destroyed Maximus and all his forces, he took everything from the palace, even the bronze statues. He even led away as captives surviving senators, accompanied by their wives; along with them he also carried off to Carthage in Africa the empress Eudoxia, who had summoned him; her daughter Placidia, the wife of the patrician Olybrius, who then was staying at Constantinople; and even the maiden Eudocia. After he had returned, Gaiseric gave the younger Eudocia, a maiden, the daughter of the empress Eudoxia, to his son Huneric in marriage, and he held them both, the mother and the daughter, in great honor"(Chron. 366).

Eudoxia was presumably following the example of her sister-in-law Justa Grata Honoria who had summoned Attila the Hun for help against an unwanted marriage. According to the chronicler Prosper of Aquitaine, Maximus was in Rome when the Vandals arrived. He gave anyone who could permission to flee the city. He attempted to flee himself but was assassinated by the imperial slaves. He had reigned for seventy-seven days. His body was thrown into the Tiber and never recovered. Victor of Tonnena agrees, adding that Pope Leo I negotiated with Gaiseric for the security of the city's population.

Hydatius attributes the assassination to revolting troops of the Roman army, enraged at Maximus' attempted flight. The Chronica Gallica of 511 attributes the assassination to a rioting crowd. Jordanes identifies a single assassin as "Ursus, a Roman soldier". Sidonius Apollinaris makes a cryptic comment about a Burgundian whose "traitorous leadership" led the crowd to panic and to the slaughter of the Emperor. His identity is unknown, presumably a general who failed to face the Vandals for one reason or another. Later historians have suggested two high-ranking Burgundians as possible candidates, Gondioc and his brother Chilperic. Both joined Theodoric II in invading Hispania later in 455.

Olybrius was in Constantinople at the time of the siege of Rome as noted by John Malalas. He was separated from his wife for the duration of her captivity. He reportedly visited Daniel the Stylite who predicted that Eudoxia and Placidia would return.

Empress
Priscus and John of Antioch report that Gaiseric entertained the idea of placing Olybrius on the throne of the Western Roman Empire, at least as early as the death of Majorian in 461. Due to his marriage to Placidia, Olybrius could be considered both an heir to the Theodosian dynasty and a member of the Vandal royal family through marriage. In 465, Libius Severus died and Gaiseric again promoted Olybrius as his candidate for the Western throne. Procopius reported that Olybrius maintained a decent relationship with his Vandal supporter.

According to the accounts of Priscus, Procopius, John Malalas, Theodorus Lector, Evagrius Scholasticus, Theophanes the Confessor, Joannes Zonaras and Cedrenus, Placidia can be estimated to have stayed a prisoner in Carthage for six to seven years. In 461 or 462, Leo I, Eastern Roman Emperor, paid a large ransom for Eudoxia and Placidia. Placidia seems to have spent the rest of her life in Constantinople.

In 472, the Western Roman Emperor Anthemius was involved in a civil war with his magister militum and son-in-law Ricimer. According to John Malalas, Leo decided to intervene and send Olybrius to quell the hostilities. Olybrius had also been instructed to offer a peace treaty to Gaiseric on his behalf. However, Leo had also sent Modestus, another messenger, to Anthemius asking him to arrange the deaths of both Ricimer and Olybrius. But Ricimer had placed Goths loyal to him at the ports of Rome and Ostia Antica and they intercepted Modestus, delivering him and his message to Ricimer himself. Ricimer revealed the contents of the message to Olybrius and the two men formed a new alliance against their former masters.

In April or May 472, Olybrius was proclaimed emperor  and the civil war proper began. John of Antioch claims that Anthemius was supported by most of the Romans while Ricimer, by the barbarian mercenaries. Odoacer, leader of the foederati, joined the cause of Ricimer, and also Gundobad, the nephew of Ricimer. According to John Malalas and John of Antioch, Gundobad managed to slay Anthemius and end the conflict. They claim that Anthemius had been abandoned by his last followers and sought refuge in a church, but Gundobad killed him anyway. But the two chroniclers differ on the location of the event. Malalas places it in the Old St Peter's Basilica while the Antiochean places it in Santa Maria in Trastevere. However Cassiodorus, Marcellinus Comes and Procopius report that Anthemius was killed by Ricimer himself. The Chronica Gallica of 511 mentions both theories, uncertain of which of the two men had done the deed.

With Anthemius dead, Olybrius became the sole Western Roman Emperor by default. Placidia became his Empress without actually leaving Constantinople, remaining there with their daughter. On 18 August, 472, Ricimer died of a "malignant fever". Paul the Deacon reports that Olybrius next appointed Gundobad as his Patrician.

On 22 October or 2 November, 472, Olybrius himself died. John of Antioch attributes his death to dropsy. Cassiodorus and Magnus Felix Ennodius report the death without noting a cause. All report on how brief the reign was.

In 478, Malchus reported that "ambassadors came to Byzantium from Carthage, under the leadership of Alexander, the guardian of Olybrius' wife [sc. Placidia]. He formerly had been sent there by Zeno with the agreement of Placidia herself. The ambassadors said that Huneric had honestly set himself up as a friend of the emperor, and so loved all things Roman that he renounced everything that he had formerly claimed from the public revenues and also the other moneys that Leo had earlier seized from his wife [sc. Eudocia]... He gave thanks that the emperor had honored the wife of Olybrius..." Placidia is last mentioned c. 484.

Placidia was probably the last Western Roman Empress whose name is still known. Glycerius and Romulus Augustus are not known to have been married. Julius Nepos had married a niece of Verina and Leo I, whose name is not mentioned in surviving records.

Children
Her only known child and daughter was Anicia Juliana, born c. 462, who spent her life at the pre-Justinian court of Constantinople. Juliana was considered "both the most aristocratic and the wealthiest inhabitant". Oost comments that "through her the descendants of Galla Placidia [Placidia's grandmother] were among the nobility of the Eastern Empire."

Ancestry

References

External links

 Her profile in the Prosopography of the Later Roman Empire
 Discussion of Petronius Maximus and his relations in "Fifth-Century Gaul"

5th-century births
5th-century deaths
5th-century Roman empresses
Theodosian dynasty
Daughters of Roman emperors
Valentinian III